Riverview High School is an accredited comprehensive public high school based in the town of Searcy, Arkansas, United States. Riverview provides secondary education for grades 9 through 12 to students in the communities of Searcy, Judsonia, Kensett and surrounding unincorporated communities of White County, Arkansas. It is the only high school of the Riverview School District.

Academics 
The assumed course of study follows the Smart Core curriculum developed by the ADE, which requires students complete at least 22 units prior to graduation. Students complete regular (core and elective) and career focus courses and exams and may take Advanced Placement (AP) courses and exam with the opportunity to receive college credit. The school also has the option for college classes through Arkansas State University Beebe. Riverview High School receives Title I federal funding.

Riverview High School is accredited by the Arkansas Department of Education (ADE) and accredited by AdvancED since 1995.

Athletics 
The Riverview High School mascot and athletic emblem is the Raider with silver, black and purple serving as the school colors.

The Riverview Raiders compete in interscholastic activities within the 3A Classification from the 3A Region 2 Conference, as administered by the Arkansas Activities Association. The Raiders field teams in football, volleyball, bowling (boys/girls), golf (boys/girls), basketball (boys/girls), soccer (boys/girls), baseball, fastpitch softball, cheer, tennis (boys/girls) and track (boys/girls). Riverview also provides students a chance to participate in the raider marching band/color guard.

References

External links 
 

Public high schools in Arkansas
Schools in White County, Arkansas